Synchronized swimming (in British English, synchronised swimming) or artistic swimming is a sport where swimmers perform a synchronized choreographed routine, accompanied by music. The sport is governed internationally by FINA (the Fédération internationale de natation or International Swimming Federation). It is traditionally a women's sport, although FINA introduced a new mixed gender duet competition that included one male swimmer in each duet at the 2015 World Aquatics Championships and LEN introduced men's individual events at the 2022 European Aquatics Championships.

Synchronised swimming has been part of the Summer Olympics program since 1984 and now features women's duet and team events. On instruction of the International Olympic Committee (IOC), FINA renamed the sport from "synchronized swimming" to "artistic swimming" in 2017—a decision that has faced controversy.

History 

At the turn of the 20th century, synchronised swimming was known as water ballet. The first recorded competition was in 1891 in Berlin, Germany. Many swim clubs were formed around that time, and the sport simultaneously developed in Canada. As well as existing as a sport, it often constituted a popular addition to Music Hall evenings, in the larger variety theatres of London or Glasgow which were equipped with on-stage water tanks for the purpose.

In 1907, Australian Annette Kellermann popularised the sport when she performed in a glass tank as an underwater ballerina (the first water ballet in a glass tank) in the New York Hippodrome.  But, Mathew Woods recorded ladies swimming about to music in a glass tank, in London in 1887. This was in his book Rambles of a Physician. After experimenting with various diving actions and stunts in the water, Katherine Curtis started one of the first water ballet clubs at the University of Chicago, where the team began executing strokes, "tricks," and floating formations. On May 27, 1939, the first U.S. synchronised swimming competition took place at Wright Junior College between Wright and the Chicago Teachers' College.

In 1924, the first competition in North America was in Montreal, with Peg Seller as the first champion.

Other important pioneers of the sport are Beulah Gundling, Käthe Jacobi, Marion Kane Elston, Dawn Bean, Billie MacKellar, Teresa Anderson, Gail Johnson, Gail Emery, Charlotte Davis, Mary Derosier, Norma Olsen and Clark Leach. Charlotte Davis coached Tracie Ruiz and Candy Costie, who won the gold medal in duet synchronised swimming at the 1984 Olympics in Los Angeles.

In 1933 and 1934, Katherine Whitney Curtis organised a show, "The Kay Curtis Modern Mermaids", for the World Exhibition in Chicago. The announcer, Norman Ross, introduced the sport as "synchronised swimming" for the first time.  The term eventually became standardised through the AAU, but Curtis still used the term "rhythmic swimming" in her book, Rhythmic Swimming: A Source Book of Synchronised Swimming and Water Pageantry (Minneapolis: Burgess Publishing Co., 1936).

Curtis persuaded the AAU to make synchronised swimming an officially recognised sport in December 1941, but she herself transferred overseas in 1943. She served as the Recreation Director of the Red Cross under Generals Patton and Eisenhower, during which time she produced the first international aquacade in Caserta, Italy. She was the Director of Travel in post-war Europe until 1962. In 1959 the Helms Hall of Fame officially recognised Curtis (along with Annette Kellerman) – ascribing to her the primary development of synchronised swimming.  In 1979 the International Swimming Hall of Fame inducted Curtis with similar accolades.

The first Official National Team Championships were held in Chicago at Riis Pool on August 11, 1946. The Town Club 'C' team were the first national champions. The team was composed of:  Polly Wesner, Nancy Hanna, Doris Dieskow, Marion Mittlacher, Shirley Brown, Audrey Huettenrauch, Phyllis Burrell and Priscilla Hirsch.

Esther Williams, a national AAU champion swimmer, popularized synchronised swimming during WWII and after, through (often elaborately staged) scenes in Hollywood films such as Bathing Beauty (1944), Million Dollar Mermaid (1952), and Jupiter's Darling (1955). In the 1970s and 1980s, Ft. Lauderdale swimming champion Charkie Phillips revived water ballet on television with The Krofftettes in The Brady Bunch Hour (1976–1977), NBC's The Big Show (1980), and then on screen with Miss Piggy in The Great Muppet Caper (1981).

Margaret Swan Forbes published Coaching Synchronized Swimming Effectively in 1984; it was the first official teaching manual for synchronized swimming.

In July 2017, following a request by the IOC, FINA approved changes to its constitution that renamed synchronised swimming to "artistic swimming". FINA justified the change by stating that it would help to clarify the nature of the sport (with the new name being similar to artistic gymnastics), and claimed it would help "enhance its popularity". The changes received criticism, with swimmers and coaches arguing that they were never consulted, and that the name "artistic swimming" diminishes the athleticism of the sport which already had historically faced an "uphill battle to be taken seriously". Another objection raised was that rebranding would cost federations and other groups involved in the sport sums of money that neither the IOC nor FINA was willing to compensate. Deputy Prime Minister of Russia Vitaly Mutko vowed that the country would still refer to the sport as synchronised swimming, stating that "to keep the name synchronised swimming is our right, and if the Federation itself, the coaches will want it, we will do it". Since then, most national governing bodies have adopted the new name, some such as the U.S. adopted it after a delay (in 2020), with the CEO of USA Artistic Swimming stating that "19 of the top 25 countries in the world are either partially or fully using the name artistic swimming". Competitions where the new name was first used include the 2019 World Aquatics Championships and the 2018 Asian Games. It will also be used at the 2020 Summer Olympics and the 2020 European Aquatics Championships.

In 2022, a spattering of competitions introduced men-only individual (solo) events for the first time, including the 2022 European Aquatics Championships and the 2022 World Junior Artistic Swimming Championships. This followed the addition of mixed gender events featuring one male and one female swimmer at the 2015 World Aquatics Championships. Later in the year, in December, the International Olympic Committee announced men were eligible to compete at the 2024 Olympic Games only in a mixed gender team event, with a cap on male participation at 25% of team event members, following the up-to-two men format of mixed gender team events at the 2022 FINA Artistic Swimming World Series.

In 2023, World Aquatics added men's solo events to the artistic swimming program for the first time at a World Aquatics Championships, scheduling the debut for the 2023 World Aquatics Championships.

Olympic Games 

The first Olympic demonstration was at the 1952 Olympic Games, where the Helsinki officials welcomed Kay Curtis and lit a torch in her honor.  Curtis died in 1980, but synchronised swimming did not become an official Olympic sport until the 1984 Summer Olympic Games.  It was not until 1968 that synchronised swimming became officially recognized by FINA as the fourth water sport next to swimming, platform diving and water polo.

From 1984 through 1992, the Summer Olympic Games featured solo and duet competitions, but they were both dropped in 1996 in favor of team competition. At the 2000 Olympic Games, however, the duet competition was restored and is now featured alongside the team competition.

World Aquatics Championships 

Synchronized swimming has been part of the World Aquatics Championships since the beginning. From 1973 through 2001, the World Aquatics Championships featured solo, duet and team competitions. In 2003, a free routine combination, comprising elements of solo, duet and team, was added. In 2005, it was renamed free combination. In 2007, solo, duet and team events were split between technical and free routines. Since 2007, seven World championship titles are at stake. In 2015, the mixed duet (technical and free) were added to the competition program.

European Aquatics Championships 
Artistic swimming is part of the program of the European Aquatics Championships from 1974.

Basic skills

Sculls 

Sculls (hand movements used to propel the body) are some of the most essential part to synchronised swimming. Commonly used sculls include support scull, stationary scull, propeller scull, alligator scull, torpedo scull, split scull, barrel scull, spinning scull, totem scull, canoe scull and paddle scull. The support scull is used most often to support the body while a swimmer is performing upside down.

The support scull or "American Scull" was invented by Marion Kane Elston and propelled the sport to new heights. The sport was transformed from water ballet to the athleticism of modern-day synchronized swimming. See the International Swimming Hall of Fame as a reference.

Support scull is performed by holding the upper arms against the sides of the body and the fore arms at 90-degree angles to the body, with hands facing the bottom of the pool. The fore arms are then moved back and forth while maintaining the right angle. The resulting pressure against the hands allows the swimmer to hold their legs above water while upside down.

Eggbeater 

The "eggbeater kick" is another important skill of synchronised swimming. It is a form of treading water that allows for stability and height above the water while leaving the hands free to perform arm motions. An average eggbeater height is usually around collarbone level. Eggbeater is used in all "arm" sections, a piece of choreography in which the swimmer is upright, often with one or both arms in the air. Another variation is a body boost, which is executed through an eggbeater buildup and a strong whip kick, propelling the swimmer out of the water vertically. A body boost can raise a swimmer out of the water to hip level.

Lifts and highlights 

A lift or highlight is when members of the team propel another teammate relatively high out of the water. They are quite common in routines of older age groups and higher skill levels.
There are many variations on lifts and these can include partner lifts, float patterns or other areas of unique, artistic choreography intended to exceptionally impress the judges and audience.

Parts 

There are three parts to every lift in synchronised swimming: The top (or "flyer"), the base, and the pushers. Sometimes there is no base and the pushers push the flyer directly.

 The Flyer is usually the smallest member of the team. Flyers must be agile and flexible, with a preferable gymnastics background if they are jumping off the lift.
 The Base tends to be of average size. Intense leg strength and a solid core is mandatory as well as the ability to hold a squat position.
 The Feet/Lifters/Pushers are the team members that provide the force for the base to explosively stand up, and the flyer to gain height out of the water.

Common types 

 The platform lift is the oldest form of highlight. In a platform, the base lays out in a back layout position underwater. The top sets in a squatting position on her torso and stands once the lift reaches the surface. The remaining teammates use eggbeater to hold the platform and the top out of the water.
 The stack lift is the most common form of lifts in synchro. The base sets up in a squatting position a few feet underwater, with the lifters holding her feet and/or legs. The top then squats on the shoulders of the base. As the lift rises, lifters extend their arms while the base and top extend their legs to achieve maximum height. A common addition to a stack lift is a rotation while it ascends or descends.
 A toss or throw is set up exactly like a stack lift. However, when the lift reaches its full height, the "flyer" on top of the lift will jump off of their teammate's shoulders, usually performing some sort of acrobatic movement or position. This is a very difficult lift and should only be attempted by experienced swimmers.
 A basket or bunken toss is a newer form of highlight that utilizes a small platform created by the interlocking hands of two lifters persons, with the flyer standing on their hands, and the base inverted standing on the underside of their hands. There will be one person lifting each of the lifters’ waists, and another person deep under the basket assisting the base in remaining vertical. These highlights are often used by national teams to achieve exceptional height out of the water for the flyer.

Positions 

There are hundreds of different regular positions that can be used to create seemingly infinite combinations. These are a few basic and commonly used ones:

 Back Layout: The most basic position. The body floats, completely straight and rigid, face-up on the surface while sculling under the hips.
  Back Tuck Somersault:  Start in a back layout position. Bring your legs into your chest and pivot yourself backwards doing a full rotation or 360. From the tuck position, extend your legs and finish in a back layout position.
 Ballet Leg: Beginning in a back layout, one leg is extended and held perpendicular to the body, while the other is held parallel to the surface of the water.
 Bent Knee (or Heron): While holding a vertical body position, one leg remains vertical while the other leg bends so that its toe is touching the knee of the vertical leg.
 Crane (or Fishtail): While holding a vertical body position, one leg remains vertical while the other is dropped parallel to the surface, making a 90-degree angle or "L" shape. More specifically, a crane position requires the 90-degree angle in the legs (even if the bottom leg is submerged), while a fishtail requires the bottom foot to be at the surface which may or may not create a 90-degree angle in the legs depending on height.
 Double Ballet Leg: Similar to ballet leg position where both legs are extended and held perpendicular to the body.
 Flamingo: Similar to ballet leg position where bottom leg is pulled into the chest so that the shin of the bottom leg is touching the knee of the vertical leg, while remaining parallel to the surface of the water.
 Front Layout: Much like a Back Layout, the only difference is that the swimmer is on his/her stomach, sculling by his/her chest, and not breathing.
  Front Walkover:  Begin in a front layout position. Scull downwards into a pike position. Lift one leg vertically into a crane position. Lower that same leg into a split position. Lift the remaining leg vertically into a knight position. Lower the remaining leg and scull above your head into a back layout position.
 Knight: The body is in a surface arch position, where the legs are flat on the surface, and the body is arched so that the head is vertically in line with the hips. One leg is lifted, creating a vertical line perpendicular to the surface.
 Side Fishtail: Side fishtail is a position which one leg remains vertical, while the other is extended out to the side parallel to the water, creating a side "Y" position.
 Split Position: With the body vertical, one leg is stretched forward along the surface and the other extended back along the surface, in an upside down split position.
 Tower:  Start in a front layout position. Scull downwards into a pike position. Lift one leg vertically into a crane position. Lift the other leg into a vertical position and descend into the water.
 Tub: Both legs are pulled up to the chest with the shins and tops of the feet dry and parallel on the surface of the water.
 Vertical:   Achieved by holding the body completely straight upside down and perpendicular to the surface usually with both legs entirely out of water.

The International Olympic Committee has further described the technical positions.

Routine 

Routines are composed of "figures" (leg movements), arm sections and highlights. Swimmers are synchronised both to each other and to the music.  During a routine swimmers can never use the bottom of the pool for support, but rather depend on sculling motions with the arms, and eggbeater kick to keep afloat. After the performance, the swimmers are judged and scored on their performance based on execution, artistic impression, and difficulty. Execution of technical skill, difficulty, patterns, choreography, and synchronization are all critical to achieving a high score.

Technical vs. free routines 

Depending on the competition level, swimmers will perform a "technical" routine with predetermined elements that must be performed in a specific order. The technical routine acts as a replacement for the figure event. In addition to the technical routine, the swimmers will perform a longer "free" routine, which has no requirements and is a chance for the swimmers to get creative and innovative with their choreography.

Length 

The type of routine and competition level determines the length of routines. Routines typically last two to four minutes, the shortest being the technical solo, with length added as the number of swimmers is increased (duets, teams, combos and highlight). Age and skill level are other important factors in determining the required routine length.

Scoring 

Free routines are scored on a scale of 100, with points for execution, artistic impression, and difficulty. Technical routines have also the evaluation of technical elements.
In group routines a group consists of 8 competitors for World Championships and FINA events, each missing participant brings penalty points to the team. A group can consist of a minimum of 4 competitors and a maximum of 10 (for Free Combination and Highlight). If a swimmer uses the bottom, they will be disqualified.

Preparation 

When performing routines in competition and practice, competitors wear a rubber noseclip to keep water from entering their nose when submerged. Some swimmers wear earplugs to keep the water out of their ears. Hair is worn in a bun and flavorless gelatin, Knox, is applied to keep hair in place; a decorative headpiece is bobby-pinned to the bun. Occasionally, swimmers wear custom-made swimming caps in place of their hair in buns.

Competitors wear custom swimsuits, usually elaborately decorated with bright fabric and sequins to reflect the music to which they are swimming. The costume and music are not judged but create an aesthetic appeal to the audience.

Makeup is also worn in this sport, but FINA has required a more natural look. No "theatrical make-up" is allowed, only makeup that provides a natural, clean and healthy glow is acceptable. In Canada, eye makeup must be smaller than a circle made by the swimmer's thumb and forefinger, and be used solely for "natural enhancement".

Underwater speakers ensure that swimmers can hear the music and aid their ability to synchronize with each other. Routines are prepared and set to counts in the music to further ensure synchronization. Coaches use underwater speakers to communicate with the swimmers during practice. Goggles, though worn during practice, are not permitted during routine competition.

Competitions

Figures 

A standard meet begins with the swimmers doing "figures", which are progressions between positions performed individually without music. All swimmers must compete wearing the standard black swimsuit and white swim cap, as well as goggles and a noseclip. Figures are performed in front of a panel of 5 judges who score individual swimmers from 1 to 10 (10 being the best). The figure competition prefaces the routine events. However, figures are only performed when a swimmer is under the age of 15/16 and has not reached the junior age group.

United States 

In the United States, competitors are divided into groups by age. The eight age groups are: 12 and under, 13–15, 16–17, 18–19, Junior (elite 15–18), Senior (elite 15+), Collegiate, and Master.  In addition to these groups, younger swimmers may be divided by ability into 3 levels: Novice, Intermediate, and age group. Certain competitions require the athlete(s) to pass a certain Grade Level. Grades as of now range from Level one to Level six, and will soon go to Level ten. Seasons range in length, and some swimmers participate year-round in competitions. There are many levels of competition, including but not limited to: State, Regional, Zone, National, Junior Olympic, and US Junior and Senior Opens. Each swimmer may compete in the following routine events: solo, duet, combo (consisting of ten swimmers), and team (consisting of eight swimmers). In the 12 & under and 13-15 age groups, figure scores are combined with routines to determine the final rankings. The 16-17 and 18-19 age groups combine the scores of the technical and free routines to determine the final rankings. USA Synchro's annual intercollegiate championships have been dominated by The Ohio State University, Stanford University, Lindenwood University (which no longer has a collegiate program), and The University of the Incarnate Word.

Canada 

In Canada, as of 2010, synchronized swimming has an age-based structure system with age groups 10 & under, 12 & under, and 13–15 for the provincial levels.  There is also a skill level which is 13–15 and juniors (16–18) known as national stream, as well as competition at the Masters and University levels. The 13–15 age group and 16–18 age group are national stream athletes that align with international age groups – 15 and Under and Junior (16–18) and Senior (18+) level athletes. Wildrose age group is for competitors before they reach 13–15 national stream. Wildrose ranges from Tier 8 and under 16 and over provincial/wildrose. These are also competitive levels. Recreational levels, called "stars", also exist. Synchro Canada requires that a competitor must pass Star 3 before entering Tier 1. To get into a Tier a swimmer must take a test for that Tier. In these tests, the swimmer must be able to perform the required movements for the level. (Canada no longer uses Tiers as a form of level placement). The Canadian University synchronised swimming League (CUASL) is intended for Canadian Swimmers who wish to continue their participation in the sport during their university studies, as well as offering a "Novice" category for those new to the sport. Traditionally, the top teams hail from McGill University, the University of Ottawa, and the University of British Columbia.

Men's and mixed competition 

Some international, national and regional competitions allow men to compete, and the Fédération internationale de natation (FINA) introduced a new mixed duet competition at the 2015 World Aquatics Championships.

In the late 19th century, synchronised swimming was a male-only event. However, in the 20th century it became a women's sport, with men banned from many competitions. In the U.S., men were allowed to participate with women until 1941, when synchronised swimming became part of the Amateur Athletic Union (AAU). The AAU required men and women to compete separately, which resulted in a decline of male participants. In the 1940s and 1950s, Bert Hubbard and Donn Squire were among the top US male competitors.

In 1978, the U.S. changed their rules to allow men to once again compete with women. Rules in other countries varied; in the UK, men were prohibited from competing until 2014, while in France, Benoît Beaufils was allowed to compete at national events in the 1990s. American Bill May was a top competitor in the late-1990s and early-2000s. He medalled in several international events, including the 1998 Goodwill Games. However, male competitors were barred from top competitions, including the World Aquatics Championships and the Olympics. However, at the 2015 World Aquatics Championships, FINA introduced a new mixed duet discipline. Both May and Beaufils returned from decade-long retirements to represent their countries. Among their competitors were Russian Aleksandr Maltsev and Italian Giorgio Minisini, both over 15 years younger than May and Beaufils. Pairs from ten countries competed in the inaugural events. The 2016 European Aquatics Championships was the first time men were allowed to compete at the European Championships. While men are allowed in more events, they were still barred from competing in the 2016 Summer Olympics. FINA did propose adding the mixed duet competition to the 2020 Summer Olympics.

In 2022, FINA allowed men to compete as soloists at the 2022 FINA Artistic Swimming World Series and the 2022 FINA World Junior Artistic Swimming Championships and LEN allowed men to compete as soloists both at the European Junior Championships and the 2022 European Aquatics Championships. The International Olympic Committee allowed for the participation of up to two men per team of eight in a mixed gender team event at the 2024 Olympic Games, competition of men in duet, solo, and men-only team events was not permitted. The mixed team format for the 2024 Olympic Games was adapted from the mixed team format, up to two men allowed per team, used at the 2022 FINA Artistic Swimming World Series (March to May 2022).

Men's solo events are scheduled to debut at the senior World Championships level at the 2023 World Aquatics Championships with solo technical and solo free routines.

Injuries 

Common injuries that may occur in synchronized swimming are tendon injuries, as the sport tends to cause muscle imbalances. Common joint injuries include the rotator cuff and the knees.

In their 2012 book Concussions and Our Kids, Dr. Robert Cantu and Mark Hyman quoted Dr. Bill Moreau, the medical director for the U.S. Olympic Committee (USOC), as saying, "These women are superior athletes. They're in the pool eight hours a day. Literally, they're within inches of one another, sculling and paddling. As they go through their various routines, they're literally kicking each other in the head." Dr. Moreau said that during a two-week training session in Colorado Springs, the female athletes suffered a 50% concussion rate. As a result, the USOC began reassessing concussion awareness and prevention for all sports.

Others believe the incidence of concussions among synchronized swimmers is much higher, especially among the sport's elite athletes. "I would say 100 percent of my athletes will get a concussion at some point," said Myriam Glez, a former French synchronized swimmer and coach. "It might be minor, might be more serious, but at some point or another, they will get hit."

See also 

 NHK Twinscam
 Swimming (sport)
 Water aerobics
 Water polo
 Composite stroke
 List of synchronised swimmers

References

External links 

 Artistic swimming at FINA
 Artistic swimming at the International Olympic Committee
 Artistic swimming at the Australian Olympic Committee
 Artistic swimming at Team GB
 Canada Artistic Swimming
 USA Artistic Swimming

Summer Olympic sports
Swimming, synchronised
Aquatics
Acrobatic sports
Women's sports
History of women's sports